Luismi may refer to:

 Luismi (footballer, born 1979), full name Luis Miguel Loro, Spanish former football forward
 Luismi (footballer, born 1983), full name Luis Miguel Gracia Julián, Spanish former football forward/winger
 Luismi (footballer, born 1992), full name Luis Miguel Sánchez Benítez, Spanish football midfielder
 Luis Guillorme (born 1994), Venezuelan-born Spanish professional baseball infielder
 Luismi Quezada, Panama football left back or winger

See also
 Luis Miguel (disambiguation)